Persatuan Sepakbola Indonesia Musi Banyuasin (simply known as Persimuba) is an Indonesian football club based in Musi Banyuasin Regency, South Sumatra. They currently compete in the Liga 3 and their homeground is Serasan Sekate Stadium.

Honours
 Liga 3 South Sumatra
 Champions: 2022
 Runner-up: 2021

References

External links

Sport in South Sumatra
Football clubs in Indonesia
Football clubs in South Sumatra